Thomas Firth may refer to:

Thomas Firth & Sons
Sir Thomas Freeman Firth, 1st Baronet (1825–1909), of the Firth baronets

See also
Firth (surname)